The Grand Prix de la Marne (commonly known as the Marne Grand Prix) was a motor race organized by the Automobile Club de Champagne and staged at the circuit Reims-Gueux on public roads located  west of the city of Reims in the Marne département of north-eastern France. It proved to be one of the fastest and most prestigious road races in Europe.

History 

The first race for automobiles was held on August 2, 1925 at the 20 km Circuit de Beine-Nauroy (approximately 10 km south-east of Reims near the Reims-Prunay airport on road D-931). In 1926, the Grand Prix moved to the Reims-Gueux circuit, starting an annual series to run un-interrupted until 1931.  By 1932, the popularity and success of the race prompted the French Automobile Club to host the French Grand Prix (billed as the XVIII Grand Prix de l'ACF)  at the then  circuit. The French GP returned  in 1938 / 1939 under grand prix regulations, two Formula 1 non-championship rounds in 1948 and 1949 and from the inaugural 1950 Formula 1 championship season for another eleven editions at various years until 1966.

Except for the 1926 Coupe d'Or (the first 12 hrs of Reims), the 1932 Grand Prix de France at Reims was the first major race not billed as the Grand Prix de la Marne even though a few contemporary sources and regional interest continued to refer to the ACF sanctioned Grand Prix de France  as "Grand Prix de la Marne". Various race name and numbering systems are still in use today. A typical example among the editions published under different race names and/or numbers is the 1952 Grand Prix: XIII Grand Prix de la Marne (F2 Register), (Stats F1)  - XX Grand Prix de la Marne" (GEL Motorsport Information Page)  - Grand Prix de France - GP de Reims (sports car) 1952 (Amis de Circuit Gueux).

The last Grand Prix de la Marne was held in 1937, effectively ending the series except for a final edition in 1952.

Grand Prix de la Marne time line

The Grand Prix de la Marne by year 

Legend:

Circuits by years

References

External links

Pre-World Championship Grands Prix
Auto races in France
Sport in Reims